The Military ranks of Mongolian People's Republic were the military insignia used by the Mongolian People's Army. Being a Satellite state of the Soviet Union, the Mongolian People's Republic shared a similar rank structure to those used by the Soviet Armed Forces.

1927–1936

Higher, senior and middle commanders

Junior commanders and enlisted men

1936–1940

Higher, senior and middle commanders

Junior commanders and enlisted men

1940–1944

Higher commanders

Middle and senior commanders

Junior commanders and enlisted men

1944–1972

Officers

Enlisted

1972–1992

Officers

Enlisted

See also
 Mongolian military ranks

References

External links
 
 

Mongolian People's Republic
Military of Mongolia